Risinghurst is an outlying residential area of Oxford, England, just outside the Eastern Bypass Road which forms part of the Oxford ring road. It is part of the Risinghurst and Sandhills civil parish and is typical of housing estates built between the wars to house an increasingly prosperous working class who were moving into new urban centres—in this instance to take advantage of the burgeoning motor industry in Oxford. 

These estates offered decent housing, relatively sizeable gardens, a garage for a car and whilst Risinghurst isn't quite a garden city it has a sense of tranquillity (the countrification coming from the pebble-dash finish, the rough stone front wall, and a decent sized front garden where roses could be – and often were – grown). During the 1930s some 600 homes were built in sets of semi-detached units; two rows of shops were built on Downside Road and more at the end of Green Road in a stretch called The Roundway along with two pubs, a small library but neither a school nor, initially, a church. This left Risinghurst not quite a self-contained community and one that, by and large, was defined by 'The Works' (Morris Motors and Pressed Steel) that offered a broad range of amenities for their employees.

History
The name Risinghurst means 'rising ground towards the hurst (or wooded hill)', reflecting the fact that Risinghurst was built on gently rising land running upwards towards Shotover Hill. Through part of the Estate runs the course of the Roman road between Silchester and Towcester. The Kilns itself is so-named because kilns were excavated here that are thought to date back to the Roman period. Evidence of Romano-British occupation was discovered during clay-quarrying in the late-19th century (these pits have now become lakes). 

Finds recorded in 1898 include building stones, gravel floors, and pottery dated mostly to the 3rd and 4th centuries but including some 2nd-century Samian ware. Coins recovered from the site and recorded by Harding in 1939 ranged from issues of Tiberius (AD 14–37) to Honorius (AD 395–423).

In the 17th century a small settlement grew up in what is now the southeast corner of the Estate—the houses are still there. Brick and tile works were established (in the middle of the 19th century three were located off what we now know as Kiln Lane) and that remained in operation until the early part of the 20th century. The rest of what is now Risinghurst was farmland. Magdalen Farm was located roughly where the top end of Stanway and Collingwood Roads now are. The northern part of Risinghurst was one large field; the southern part was a number of smaller fields. On the site where Nielsen's HQ now sits was a house called Shotover Lodge in the middle of the 19th century but Forest Lodge by the turn of the 20th century.

Up until the late 18th century, the Oxford to London road ran over Shotover Hill. Then a turnpike was opened on a new route further north with upwards of 80 coaches plus the Mail coach making the trip to London daily. This is today's A40 road that forms the northern boundary of Risinghurst. An 18th century turnpike milestone (Oxford 3, London 51) can still be seen on the central reservation near the Thornhill Park and Ride. (Thornhill itself is both the name of the farm to the east of Risinghurst and the hill that rises towards Shotover.) Bounding the western edge of Risinghurst is Green Road. Maps from the 19th century show that it was a road at that time and it is probably older; its original name was Toot Hill Butts as the road ran through an ancient field of that name.

In the mid to late 1930s the bulk of the Estate was built primarily by Benfield and Loxley (an Oxford building firm started in the late 19th century and still in existence) and sold between £350 to £500 in 1936. Most of the houses in Risinghurst are still these pebble-dashed semi-detached 1930s three-bedroom houses, although the newer houses behind Nielsen's UK headquarters date from the 1970s, some smaller ex-council houses date from the late 1980s, and 18 houses built in 1997 are on the site of a coppice. The Estate was built primarily to house the increasing number of workers then employed at Morris Motors (by 1937 Morris Motors was the largest motor manufacturer in Europe); until relatively recently, most of the home-owners were still likely to be employed in the automotive industry.

One tragic accident happened in September 1939 when Trevor Thomas, a six year old boy, died after receiving fatal injuries when a practice bomb fell from an RAF plane and went through the roof of the family's home. The family lived at 97 Stanway Road and the boy was in bed when the accident happened. His brother was in the same bedroom but survived unharmed. The incident was reported widely in the UK press. However it would appear that most of the reports had a major error as they gave the boy's name as Trevor Love with his parents being Frederick and Margaret. In fact he was Trevor Thomas and he and his brother David were evacuees from London. Both were sleeping in one bedroom, the bomb crashed into their bed and then into the living room and finally embedded in the foundations of the house. Much of the furniture in the living room was destroyed but the overall structure of the house remained intact. A report in the Evening Despatch 25 September 1939 quoted a Mr K Bishop who lived nearby as saying that first he heard whistling, then a dull thud and saw smoke rising. He went to the scene but air raid wardens and auxiliary firemen were already there.

The Love family had to move out while the house was repaired but after their return Mr and Mrs Love continued to live in the house until their deaths in 1975 and 2001 respectively.

In 1958 work started on the Eastern Bypass—a plan had been under discussion for 30 years and when Risinghurst was built, a gap was left between it and Headington Quarry so that a road could be built. This dual carriageway cut off Risinghurst from Headington Quarry. The latter, until then, had been seen as part of the same district by the residents. Now Risinghurst was very much an island with two major trunk roads running along two sides and open countryside along the rest. In 1968 the turn into Risinghurst from the dual carriageway was blocked off causing anger among residents and letters to the local press such as this:
Does the Oxford City Corporation really think that by closing the Risinghurst turn for cars, mopeds etc it will reduce accident figures for that stretch of road. In my view, cyclists and moped riders returning from the factories will be jostling to get through the ridicuously small gap. I don't think that many men, especially on mopeds, are going to continue up the Green Road Roundabout, and then on to the A40...
The OCC eventually capitulated. The 2001 Census showed that of 840 people in employment who lived in Risinghurst, 165 worked in healthcare/social work (no doubt due to the proximity of the John Radcliffe Hospital), 130 in real estate/renting/business activities, 121 in education, and only 105 in manufacturing. The Green Road or Headington roundabout that lies on the north-eastern corner has become over the years a nationally known landmark, the County's worst accident black-spot and also a traffic-jam nightmare. In 2006, it was ripped-up and replaced at a cost of £2m by a new 'hamburger' design. In the past, the Estate was bisected by the City Boundary. The part of the Estate within the Bullingdon Rural District Council (the 'County') enjoyed grass verges—lacking in the 'City' sector. The divide meant that children in the two administrative parts went to different schools—this led to little intermingling between families. Both parts also had their own playing fields to further add to the division. However, in 1992, the whole of Risinghurst was brought into the City.

There is no school in Risinghurst. In the past, infants and primary aged children who lived in the 'County' attended Sandhills County Primary School. If they passed their 11-plus, they went to either Lord Williams's Grammar School in Thame, or Holton Park Girls Grammar School, Wheatley. If they failed, they went to the Harlow School in Marston. (It is worth noting that prior to 1947, only children living city-half were able to go on to a grammar school education.) Those who lived in the 'City', went to primary schools in Headington Quarry; the secondary schools were either Bayswater or Littlemore Grammar School. Nowadays, the whole of Risinghurst is in the Sandhills Community Primary School and Wheatley Park catchment areas. When the estate was first built no provision for a community centre was made. In the late 1940s a residents group obtained an old Army building from Major Miller's Estate near Wheatley. This was dismantled brick by brick and rebuilt on a corner of the allotments off Kiln Lane. During the 1950s regular events that were held there included whist drives, bingo, beetle drives and old time dancing. Saturday night became the youth night with a weekly hop.

Political
Risinghurst is part of the Risinghurst and Sandhills Parish Council. The PC covers an area of some  that naturally encompasses Sandhills and Risinghurst but one that also stretches up over Shotover and down its southern slopes; and east towards Forest Hill. The Parish Council was formed in 1956, breaking out from the bigger Forest Hill and Shotover PC. Within Oxfordshire County Council, Risinghurst is part of the Quarry and Risinghurst Ward and is represented by two councillors; at national level it forms part of the Oxford East parliamentary constituency.

Places and people of interest 
Risinghurst was home to the author C. S. Lewis, who lived in a house called The Kilns for 33 years until his death in 1963. During his time at the address he wrote many of his books, most notably the Narnia books which were published between 1950 and 1956. Behind the house is a large wild area, now a nature reserve, but then the garden and this wild area is said to have been the inspiration both for Narnia and possibly for Tolkien's Middle-earth. 'Jack' Lewis and his brother Warnie purchased the house in 1930. Warnie described it as follows: 'The house stands at the entrance to its own grounds at the northern foot of Shotover at the end of a narrow lane, which in turn opens off a very bad and little used road [now Kiln Lane], giving us great privacy as can reasonably be looked for near a city.' After the Estate was built, The Kilns was given an address as being on Ringwood Road.

In 1969 The Berkshire, Buckinghamshire, and Oxfordshire Wildlife Trust bought the lake and woodland behind the Kilns. The Trust describes the woods as follows: 'The steeply rising woodland includes beech, birch, alder, sycamore and larch. Dotted around the reserve are large sandstone boulders known as doggers on the slopes in the trees. The pond is full of aquatic plants and many toads migrate here to spawn in spring, when the garden is also full of birdsong. Moorhens and coots regularly nest here and other visitors include herons, kingfishers and warblers. Giant horsetail grows at the margins of a stream which flows in from the east and there are spectacular displays of dragonflies and damselflies in summer.'

At some time in the late 20th century, brick kilns and a drying barn that were also on the Lewis's property were demolished. More of his land was sold for housing and the orchard that once belonged to the house now contains seven large houses (the lane leading through the orchard to the house is now known as Lewis Close.) The California-based C.S. Lewis Foundation bought The Kilns itself in the 1980s for £130,000 and has restored it to its original 1930s appearance – though there is no original furniture as it was auctioned off when Warnie died. A bid to gain listed status for the house was rejected in February 2002. The house is open by appointment.

These woods are part of the old Royal Forest of Shotover and Shotover itself is situated on the steep hill beyond the nature reserve. At its top is Shotover Country Park, which is home to a variety of wildlife and is, in part, designated as a Site of Special Scientific Interest. Shotover is one of the higher limestone hills that ring Oxford and the top of the hill offers views of Oxfordshire, although Oxford itself is hard to see. Perhaps not surprisingly, over 300,000 people visit Shotover each year. Ride frontman Mark Gardener lived as a child at 58 Ringwood Road during the 1970s. The southeastern corner of the estate is bounded by playing fields: a mix of maintained sports pitches, streams, ponds and wilderness; the home ground of Risinghurst Cricket Club, and a haven for children.

Businesses and services
The centre of Risinghurst is Downside Road, home to The Ampleforth, the local public house built in 1938, by the now defunct Ind Coope.  Risinghurst's Grovelands Road Sports Ground is home to Headington Youth Football Club. In another part of Risinghurst is a harpsichord factory: Robert Goble & Son is a maker of harpsichords, clavichords and spinets. The company is at Greatstones, a large house further up the lane that leads off The Kilns. Robert Goble (1903–1991) started making recorders and harpsichords here during the late 1940s when he moved to Greatstones from Haslemere. By 1954, they stopped making recorders and concentrated on harpsichords becoming an internationally known name. Historically, back in the 1930s and 40s, a small weaving company operated at the top of Kiln Lane called Samarkand Hand Weavers; C S Lewis in a diary noted that Warnie had, in 1934, bought two ties from them.

On the Headington Roundabout corner of the estate – known as The Roundway – is another row of shops and a McDonald's fast food restaurant. This used to be the Shotover Arms built in 1931 as another Ind Coope pub. A large mock Tudor building with black timbering, it was converted into a hotel in 1957 when the southern by-pass was built. It had several bars—all open to the public—and a large off-licence. What is now a Carphone Warehouse store was originally a filling station. A dentist can also be found close by but so far as is known, there was never a doctors' surgery. Back in 1956, Kelly's Directory records these – a typical set of local retail businesses. At the end of Kiln Lane and the back of Shelley Close is a number of light engineering units. (In 1956 this included A C Carter, builders, and the Oxford Joinery and Woodworking Company.)

Public transport for the estate was provided for decades by the Number 2 bus route that originally ran from Risinghurst via (Oxford High Street and Cornmarket) to Summertown and Kidlington. In 2005, this was terminated as traffic problems were causing severe disruption to the timetable. Now the Number 9 runs from Downside Road, outside the pub, to the centre of Oxford, on Mondays through Saturdays every 30 minutes from about 7 am through to about 7 pm, and after that hourly until 11 pm. There is an hourly bus service on Sundays, which was introduced in July 2011, following numerous appeals by residents for an extended bus service.

Church
Risinghurst has one church: Collinwood Road United Reformed Church. The congregation first came together during the Second World War, meeting at various locations in the district under the supervision of Temple Cowley Congregational Church. In 1945 they signed a covenant which formed Collinwood Congregational Church and, in September 1949, the first church building—an Orlitt prefabricated concrete structure—was opened. Over 200 people attended the ceremony as the Rev. John Philips unlocked the door and participated in the service led by the Rev. A.R. Vine. The following day, the first Children's Service was held. In 1951 the Rev. Tom Stiff (1920–2002) was appointed as pastor. He and his wife Peggy lived in a caravan until the manse was completed in 1953. He retired in 1986 but remained a member of the church, and in 2001 celebrated 50 years association with Collinwood Road.

The original simple church building is now used a hall. The current church itself was built in the early 1960s and is a simple but effective expression of church architecture. Fund raising for this new church was launched through a 'Buy a Brick' campaign. Tom Stiff and churchgoers collected money at various points in Headington in 1959 such as outside the Westminster Bank at 91 High Street Headington, and in Barton, Risinghurst and Sandhills, holding up posters that read, 'Be a brick – Buy a brick – Bob a Brick.' Passers-by were urged to give a 'bob' or 1/- to pay for one brick. Two months after the start of the campaign, £187.18s had been raised towards the £3,000 target. 

A second church hall was built in the 1980s. In 1972 the Church became part of the United Reformed Church (a union of Congregationalists, Presbyterians and later Churches of Christ) which is the now the main representative of the Reformed tradition in England. The current minister is the Rev. Dick Wolff. The Church provides a number of services to the community, including a weekly lunch-club for the elderly and a coffee lounge which is open for anyone to drop around for conversation, coffee, tea and biscuits on weekday mornings. It also provides space for Scout and Guide Association groups. Since the early 1960s, the 16th Oxford Cubs and Scouts have met at the Church. The building is currently shared with three other congregations: the Presbyterian Church of Korea, the Punjabi-speaking Asian Evangelical Church, and a Portuguese-speaking (largely Brazilian) Assemblies of God church.

References

Sources

External links
 Risinghurst and Sandhills Parish Council website
 An unofficial Shotover House website 
 Jock Coats's Risinghurst Blog
 Goble Harpsichords
 United Reformed Church

Areas of Oxford
Housing estates in Oxfordshire